Gornji Črnci is a village in the Municipality of Cankova in the Prekmurje region of northeastern Slovenia.

Name
Gornji Črnci was attested in historical sources in 1366 as Korlatfalua, a corruption of Hungarian Konradfalva (i.e., 'Konrad's village'). Today's Slovenian name Gornji Črnci (literally, 'upper Črnci') is derived from Črnec Creek, a tributary of the Ledava River that flows through the  village.

References

External links
Gornji Črnci on Geopedia

Populated places in the Municipality of Cankova